Nicholas Crane (born 6 May 1954) is an English geographer, explorer, writer and broadcaster. Since 2004 he has written and presented four television series for BBC Two: Coast, Great British Journeys, Map Man and Town.

Early life and education
Crane was born in Hastings, East Sussex, but grew up in Norfolk.  He attended Wymondham College from 1967 until 1972, then Cambridgeshire College of Arts & Technology (CCAT), a forerunner to Anglia Ruskin University, where he studied Geography.

In his youth he went camping and hiking with his father and explored Norfolk by bicycle, which gave him his enthusiasm for exploration.

Career 
In 1986 he located the pole of inaccessibility for the Eurasia landmass travelling with his cousin Richard; their journey being the subject of the book Journey to the Centre of the Earth. In 1992–93 he embarked on an 18-month solo journey, walking 10,000 kilometres from Cape Finisterre to Istanbul. He recounted the trip in his book Clear Waters Rising: A Mountain Walk Across Europe which won the Thomas Cook Travel Book Award in 1997, and made a television self-documentary of the journey: High Trails to Istanbul (1994).

His 2000 book Two Degrees West described his walk North to South down Great Britain in which he followed the eponymous meridian as closely as possible. In 2003 he published a biography of Gerard Mercator, the great Flemish cartographer.

Together with Richard Crane he was awarded the 1992 Mungo Park Medal by the Royal Scottish Geographical Society for his journeys in Tibet, China, Afghanistan and Africa.

In 2007 he completed a series called Great British Journeys. In eight parts the series consisted of eight people who explored Great Britain and made a contribution to society born of the exploration. Each episode lasts one hour and the series was accompanied by a book. 

In November 2007 he debated the future of the English countryside with Richard Girling, Sue Clifford, Richard Mabey and Bill Bryson as part of CPRE's annual Volunteers Conference.

He presented a series about British towns broadcast in August 2011 and May–June 2013.

He has served as a visiting professor at Anglia Ruskin University which presented the former student in 2012 with the award of Honorary Doctor of Science.

He was elected President of the Royal Geographical Society in 2015, though the post is now occupied by Nigel Clifford.

In 2016 he published The Making Of The British Landscape: From the Ice Age to the Present, a 12,000-year historical geography of Britain.

Personal life 
Crane lives in Primrose Hill in northwest London with his wife; they have three children.

Books
The CTC Route Guide to Cycling in Britain and Ireland (with Christa Gausden, 1980)
Cycling Guide (Tantivy Press, annually 1980–86)
Cycling in Europe (1984)
Bicycles Up Kilimanjaro (with Richard Crane, 1985)
Journey to the Centre of the Earth (with Richard Crane, 1987)
Richard's Mountain Bike Book (with Charles Kelly, edited by Richard Ballantine, 1988)
Nick Crane's Action Sports (1989)
Atlas Biker: Cycling in Morocco. O.U.P. (1990)
Clear Waters Rising: A Mountain Walk Across Europe (1996)
Two Degrees West: An English Journey (2000)
Mercator: The Man Who Mapped the Planet (2003)
Great British Journeys (2007)
Coast A Journey around our Shores (2010)
The Making Of The British Landscape: From the Ice Age to the Present (2016)

Television
Now Get Out of That – as a contestant representing Oxford, 1982
High Trails to Istanbul (1994)
Map Man (8x30m, 2004 and 8x30m, 2005)
Coast (as main presenter, 13x60m, 2005 and as regular contributor 2006 to present)
Great British Journeys (8x60m, 2007)
Beeching's Tracks – featured presenter of Episode 1 East. Broadcast 13 November 2008 on BBC Four
Nicholas Crane's Britannia: The Great Elizabethan Journey (3x60m, 2009)
In Search of England’s Green and Pleasant Land: East (30m, 2009) Broadcast 5 June 2009 on BBC Four
Munro: Mountain Man (60m, 2009) Broadcast 20 September on BBC Four
TOWN with Nicholas Crane (4x60m, 2011 and 4x60m, 2013)

References

External links
 
 Interview with Wanderlust magazine
 BBC's Coast
 Interview with Nicholas Crane on Keeper of the Snails

1954 births
Living people
Alumni of Anglia Ruskin University
English travel writers
Walkers of the United Kingdom
People from Wymondham
People educated at Wymondham College
Presidents of the Royal Geographical Society